The Danbury Jr. Hat Tricks are a USA Hockey-sanctioned junior ice hockey organization based in Danbury, Connecticut. The organization has junior teams in the Tier II North American Hockey League and the Tier III North American 3 Hockey League, both of which play home games at the Danbury Ice Arena.

The teams are named after and operated the ownership of the Danbury Hat Tricks, a minor professional team in the Federal Prospects Hockey League that was founded in 2019.

History
Since its renovation in 2004, the Danbury Ice Arena had hosted several minor league professional hockey teams with varying levels of success. The last had been the Danbury Titans of the Federal Hockey League (FHL), which folded in 2017 due to the cost of workers' compensation insurance being more than the team was making. In 2019, the arena was sold to Diamond Properties (DP 110, LLC), who then bought two franchises to play in their arena for the 2019–20 season: the Danbury Colonials of the Tier III junior North American 3 Hockey League (NA3HL) and another FHL (since rebranded as Federal Prospects Hockey League) team in the Danbury Hat Tricks.

The Colonials' franchise was purchased from the Niagara Falls PowerHawks organization and Kevin Cunningham was named as the first head coach of the Colonials. Billy McCreary, son of former NHL player Bill McCreary Jr., was named the FPHL team's head coach and general manager. Former NHL player Colton Orr was named as co-owner and managing partner of both teams. The Colonials finished in second the Northeast Division in their inaugural season, but the playoffs were curtailed by the onset of the COVID-19 pandemic in March 2020.

On May 11, 2020, the organization announced they had also bought a franchise in the Tier II junior North American Hockey League (NAHL) from the Wilkes-Barre/Scranton Knights and would be named the Danbury Jr. Hat Tricks after the professional team. Billy McCreary, who had won Coach of the Year in the FPHL in his first season, stepped down from his coaching position with the professional team and became head coach of the NAHL team. Subsequently, the Colonials would also be rebranded before the 2020–21 season to align with the rest of the organization. Due to the limited capacity during the pandemic and interstate travel restrictions, the NA3HL team was one of several East Division teams to temporarily relocate to Massachusetts midseason, with the team playing out of Springfield, Massachusetts, as the Springfield Jr. Hat Tricks, before returning to Danbury in March 2021.

Following the 2020–21 season, Doug Friedman was hired as the head coach of the Tier III Hat Tricks, but left before coaching a game to join his alma mater, Boston University, as their director of hockey operations. The Jr. Hat Tricks then hired Tyler Noseworthy as head coach of the NA3HL team.

Following the 2021-22 season, McCreary would return to be the Head Coach of the Danbury Hat Tricks while becoming President of Hockey Operations overseeing all three teams in the organization.  Longtime assistant coach Matt Voity became the Head Coach and General Manager of the NAHL team, while Noseworthy remained with the NA3HL team, both would stay on as assistant coaches for the FPHL team.

Season-by-season records

NAHL team

NA3HL team

References

External links
NAHL's Jr. Hat Tricks
NA3HL's Jr. Hat Tricks

North American Hockey League teams
Ice hockey clubs established in 2019
Ice hockey teams in Connecticut
2019 establishments in Connecticut
Danbury, Connecticut
Sports in Fairfield County, Connecticut